Daniel Lewis Smith (born 5 September 1999) is an English professional footballer who plays for National League South side Dulwich Hamlet.

Smith primarily plays as a centre-forward but has also featured as a central midfielder and as a right-back.

Club career

Portsmouth
He made his Portsmouth first-team debut on 8 January 2019 starting in a 2–0 win against Southend United in the EFL Trophy. Smith spent the first half of the 2018–19 season on loan at Bognor Regis Town and scored 14 goals in 21 matches in all competitions.

Cork City (loan)
On 21 February 2019, Smith joined League of Ireland club Cork City F.C. on loan for the remainder of the EFL season. On 22 March 2019, he won his first senior honour as Cork defeated Midleton F.C. 3–1 to win the Munster Senior Cup.

Eastleigh
On 10 July 2020, Smith joined National League side Eastleigh following a prolific season with Bognor Regis Town. On 29 August 2021, he joined Hereford on loan.  Following his loan spell at Hereford, he played a few games at Eastleigh before being sent on another loan spell to National League rivals Weymouth in February 2022, who were struggling in the relegation zone.

Dulwich Hamlet
On 8 July 2022, Smith joined National League South side Dulwich Hamlet.

Career statistics

Honours
Cork City
 Munster Senior Cup: 2018–19

References

1999 births
Living people
English footballers
Association football midfielders
Association football forwards
Portsmouth F.C. players
Bognor Regis Town F.C. players
Cork City F.C. players
Eastleigh F.C. players
Hereford F.C. players
Weymouth F.C. players
Dulwich Hamlet F.C. players
Isthmian League players
League of Ireland players
National League (English football) players
English expatriate footballers
English expatriate sportspeople in Ireland
Expatriate association footballers in the Republic of Ireland